The 1938 UCI Track Cycling World Championships were the World Championship for track cycling. They took place in Amsterdam, Netherlands from 27 August to 4 September 1938. Three events for men were contested, two for professionals and one for amateurs.

Medal summary

Medal table

See also
 1938 UCI Road World Championships

References

Track cycling
UCI Track Cycling World Championships by year
International cycle races hosted by the Netherlands
1938 in track cycling
August 1938 sports events
September 1938 sports events
1930s in Amsterdam
Cycling in Amsterdam